Chrysochroa ocellata is a Jewel Beetle or Metallic Wood-boring Beetle of the Buprestidae family.

Description
Elytra and pronotum are metallic green. Elytra have a longitudinal bright reddish band interrupted by a broad rounded yellow-orange spot in the middle. The legs are bright green.

Distribution
These beetles can be found in India.

Subspecies
 Chrysochroa ocellata fulgens (DeGeer, 1778)
 Chrysochroa ocellata ocellata (Fabricius, 1775)

References
 Biolib
 Zipcodezoo Species Identifier

Buprestidae
Beetles described in 1775
Taxa named by Johan Christian Fabricius